Tornado Chasers is an American documentary series that premiered on September 19, 2012 on TVNweather.com. The program follows Reed Timmer and his team of storm chasers as they attempt to intercept tornadoes in Tornado Alley in the United States and Canada. Season 2, funded largely through a successful Kickstarter campaign, commenced on September 30, 2013. The series is a two-time Webby Award Honoree, once for Best Documentary Series in 2013, and again for Best Editing ("Home, Part 2") in 2014.

Overview
Tornado Chasers was filmed each year during storm season in Tornado Alley, using Timmer's Norman, Oklahoma home as a base. Contrary to previous series about storm chasing, Tornado Chasers takes a more personal approach, conveying the chronological, authentic storm chasing experience. During the 2012 season, Timmer's team mainly consisted of Dick McGowan, Chris Chittick, and Terry Rosema. For the 2013 season, Timmer reconnected with Joel Taylor, joined the KFOR-TV NewsChannel 4 Oklahoma City severe weather team, and welcomed broadcast meteorologists Jim Cantore and Ginger Zee as guest chase partners. He also introduced the new Dominator 3, the largest of his armored intercept vehicles.

Dedications
The episode titled "Home, Part 2" which debuted on December 5, 2013, ends with a dedication to all who lost their lives in the Moore, OK tornado of May 20, 2013. The season 2 finale titled "Nemesis, Part 2" which debuted on January 23, 2014, ends with a dedication to Tim Samaras, Paul Samaras, Carl Young, all of team TWISTEX, as well as amateur chaser Richard Henderson, all who lost their lives in the El Reno, OK tornado of May 31, 2013.

Episodes

Season 1 (2012)
During the 2012 season, which consisted of 12 episodes, Timmer continues chasing during the year following the final season of Discovery's Storm Chasers. Joel Taylor left the team. Team members for the 2012 season included Dick McGowan (Dominator driver), Mike Scantlin (driver/shooter), and Chris Chittick (shooter).

Season 2 (2013)
In late February 2013, TVN launched a Kickstarter campaign to fund a second season of Tornado Chasers. The campaign was enormously successful, almost doubling the original goal. Production commenced on April 5, 2013. This season saw the return of Joel Taylor (albeit briefly) to the team, and Reed became a field correspondent for the KFOR-TV storm team in Oklahoma City. A new Dominator vehicle, "Dominator 3," joined the fleet and featured the latest vehicle intercept technology. Jim Cantore from The Weather Channel also joined Timmer in the Dominator for some of the bigger tornado events, and Ginger Zee from ABC News joined Timmer's team for the May 20, 2013 Moore tornado event. The TVN team also runs into Tim Samaras, Paul Samaras, and Carl Young days before the multiple-vortex tornado took their lives.

Season 2: Ultimate Tornadoes (2014)
After the completion of the second season, seven supplemental episodes were produced. These episodes featured extensive content, such as an extended "tornado cut" of the season, behind the scenes, and educational material. These episodes premiered on February 18, 2014.

Release
The entire Tornado Chasers series is available from TVN On-Demand. Season 2 is also available on Hulu and Amazon Prime. The second season is also available on Blu-ray.

An ebook titled The Making of Tornado Chasers: Behind the Scenes of the Groundbreaking Documentary Series was released on August 20, 2014. It was written by executive producer Ken Cole, along with a foreword by Reed Timmer, and features journal-style remembrances from the production.

References

External links
 
 
 TornadoVideos.Net
 Storm Chasers on YourDiscovery.com

Storm chasing
2012 American television series debuts
2014 American television series endings
2010s American reality television series
2010s American documentary television series